|}

The Cotswold Chase is a Grade 2 National Hunt steeplechase in Great Britain which is open to horses aged five years or older. It is run on the New Course at Cheltenham over a distance of about 3 miles and 1½ furlongs (3 miles 1 furlong and 156 yards, or 5,172 metres), and during its running there are twenty-one fences to be jumped. The race is scheduled to take place each year in January.

The race was first run in 1980 as the Tote Double Chase, later the Timeform Hall of Fame Chase.
The event serves as a trial for the Cheltenham Gold Cup, which takes place at the same venue in March. It is held during Festival Trials Day, which features several other trials for races at the Cheltenham Festival. The event is registered as the Cotswold Chase, but it has usually been known by a sponsored title. The wine merchant Bibendum supported the race from 2010 to 2014, and its 2014 title promoted Argento, an Argentinian wine brand. From 2015 to 2019 the race was sponsored by the BetBright bookmaking firm. and since 2020 it has been sponsored by Paddy Power.

Winners

See also
 Horse racing in Great Britain
 List of British National Hunt races

References

 Racing Post:
 
 pedigreequery.com – Cotswold Chase – Cheltenham.

External links
 Race Recordings

National Hunt races in Great Britain
Cheltenham Racecourse
National Hunt chases
Recurring sporting events established in 1980
1980 establishments in England